Naor Dahan (born 26 September 1990) is an Israeli footballer who plays for Hapoel Beit She'an in Liga Alef.

References

1990 births
Living people
Israeli footballers
Footballers from Haifa District
Beitar Nes Tubruk F.C. players
Maccabi Ironi Tirat HaCarmel F.C. players
Hapoel Hadera F.C. players
Maccabi Be'er Sheva F.C. players
Hapoel Asi Gilboa F.C. players
Hapoel Acre F.C. players
Hapoel Herzliya F.C. players
Hapoel Ironi Baqa al-Gharbiyye F.C. players
Ironi Tiberias F.C. players
Ihud Bnei Kafr Qara F.C. players
F.C. Tzeirei Kafr Kanna players
Hapoel Beit She'an F.C. players
Liga Leumit players
Israeli Premier League players
Association football defenders